Tyler Farrar (born June 2, 1984) is an American former road racing cyclist, who rode professionally between 2003 and 2017 for the , , ,  and  squads.

Farrar's achievements include winning the 2009 Circuit Franco-Belge and the 2009 and 2010 Vattenfall Cyclassics. In Grand Tours, Farrar has won six individual stages, as well as assisting in two team time trial wins.

Cycling career
In April 2006, he crashed near the finish of the Circuit de la Sarthe, which resulted in a broken collarbone, causing him to miss most of the season.

He has won stages in the Giro d'Italia, Vuelta a España,  Tour de France, Three Days of De Panne, and the USA Pro Cycling Challenge. He wore the yellow jersey on stage three of the 2008 Tour of California after winning intermediate sprint points during stage two.

Until the end of his career in 2017, Farrar lived in the Belgian city of Ghent, where he was made an honorary citizen in 2012. He was fluent in Dutch and was popular in Flanders.

In May 2011, Farrar withdrew from the Giro d'Italia as a mark of respect for his friend and training partner Wouter Weylandt, who was killed in an accident during the race. This tragedy occurred on stage 3 and on stage 4 the teams agreed not to race at all as they completed the entire stage at a steady pace with each team taking ten kilometers at the front with no attacks being made and the peloton staying together the entire time. Three kilometres from the finish Weylandt's eight teammates on Team Leopard-Trek came to the front and were also joined by Farrar, even though he was riding for Garmin-Cervelo. The nine riders rode together side by side as the rest of the peloton stayed back and as they approached the finish they did so arm in arm for the final fifty or so meters, all crossing the line together. The entire Leopard-Trek team and Farrar bowed out of the race following this tribute to their fallen teammate.

On July 4, 2011, Farrar won his first Tour de France stage, Stage 3 from Olonne-sur-Mer to Redon, becoming the first American to win a stage of the Tour on the Fourth of July. It would be ten years before another American would win a Tour de France stage.

Farrar crashed four times in the 2012 Tour de France, including a sprint-finish crash, after which he stormed the  team bus to confront Tom Veelers, whom he blamed for the incident. He later took his first two wins of the season at the 2012 USA Pro Cycling Challenge. In the opening stage of that race, Farrar arrived in Telluride with a field of 57 riders and won a reduced bunch sprint at the finish. Afterwards, he stated that he was surprised to have survived the mountainous terrain to be able to contend for the sprint. Farrar won again in the fifth stage of the race, dedicating the win to his former Madison partner Mike Creed, who had been raising money for the victims of the Waldo Canyon fires. Due to his two wins he consolidated enough points to win the green jersey. Later in the season, Farrar crashed heavily during the first stage of the Tour of Britain, reportedly suffering a concussion. In October, Farrar was given clearance to train by the team doctor, Prentice Steffen, who stated: "The health of the athlete is always our top priority."

Farrar has a reputation for causing or being involved in crashes. Alessandro Petacchi noted that Farrar had crashed 18 times in the 2013-2014 seasons, commenting "There is probably a reason for this". Farrar denies using reckless or uncoordinated tactics, and ascribed most of his numerous crashes to "realities of modern cycling".

After riding in the 2017 Grand Prix Cycliste de Montréal, Farrar announced his retirement from competition.

When Farrar took the stage victory in the 2011 Tour de France it gave him a stage win in all three grand tours. Tyler Hamilton is the only other American to have accomplished this.

Post-cycling
After retiring from cycle racing, Farrar became a firefighter in Kirkland, Washington, as part of the City of Kirkland Fire Department.

Major results

2001
 10th Time trial, UCI Junior Road World Championships
2002
 1st  Overall Tour de l'Abitibi
1st Stage 4
2003
 9th Ronde van Vlaanderen U23
2004
 1st  Time trial, National Under-23 Road Championships
 1st Stage 7 Tour de l'Avenir
 2nd Criterium, National Road Championships
 9th Paris–Tours Espoirs
 10th La Côte Picarde
2005
 1st  Criterium, National Road Championships
 1st Stage 4 Ronde de l'Isard
 1st Stage 2 Tour de l'Avenir
 2nd Road race, National Under-23 Road Championships
 2nd Grand Prix de Waregem
 5th Wachovia Classic
 10th Time trial, UCI Under-23 Road World Championships
2006
 5th Overall Tour du Poitou-Charentes
 5th Grand Prix de Rennes
2007
 GP CTT Correios de Portugal
1st Points classification
1st Stage 2
 9th Kuurne–Brussels–Kuurne
2008
 1st  Overall Tour of the Bahamas
1st  Points classification
1st Stages 2 & 3
 1st Stage 1 Tour du Poitou-Charentes
 1st Stage 4 (TTT) Tour de Georgia
 4th Univest Grand Prix
 5th Paris–Tours
 6th Philadelphia International Championship
 8th Lehigh Valley Classic
 9th Grand Prix d'Isbergues
2009
 1st  Overall Tour de Wallonie-Picarde
1st  Points classification
1st Stages 1 & 2
 1st  Overall Delta Tour Zeeland
1st  Points classification
1st Prologue
 1st Vattenfall Cyclassics
 Eneco Tour
1st Stages 1, 2 & 4
 1st Stage 3 Tirreno–Adriatico
 1st Stage 11 Vuelta a España
2010
 1st  Overall Delta Tour Zeeland
1st  Points classification
 1st Vattenfall Cyclassics
 1st Scheldeprijs
 Giro d'Italia
1st Stages 2 & 10
 Vuelta a España
1st Stages 5 & 21
 1st Stage 3 Three Days of De Panne
 2nd GP Ouest–France
 3rd Omloop Het Nieuwsblad
 5th Tour of Flanders
 6th Coppa Bernocchi
 9th Gent–Wevelgem
 10th UCI World Ranking
2011
 1st Trofeo Palma de Mallorca
 1st Trofeo Cala Millor
 Tour de France
1st Stages 2 (TTT) & 3
 1st Stage 2 Tirreno–Adriatico
 1st Stage 2 Ster ZLM Toer
 3rd Dwars door Vlaanderen
 3rd Gent–Wevelgem
 4th Kuurne–Brussels–Kuurne
 10th Road race, UCI Road World Championships
2012
 USA Pro Cycling Challenge
1st  Points classification
1st Stages 1 & 5
 1st Stage 4 (TTT) Giro d'Italia
 1st Stage 2 (TTT) Tour of Utah
 2nd Overall Tour of Qatar
1st Stage 2 (TTT)
 2nd Scheldeprijs
 5th Overall Driedaagse van West-Vlaanderen
2013
 1st Stage 4 Tour of California
 2nd Trofeo Palma de Mallorca
 2nd Trofeo Campos–Santanyí–Ses Salines
 3rd Overall Tour de l'Eurométropole
1st Stage 3
 4th Paris–Tours
 6th Scheldeprijs
2014
 Tour of Beijing
1st  Points classification
1st Stage 3
 2nd Dwars door Vlaanderen
 2nd Scheldeprijs
 4th Vattenfall Cyclassics
 8th Overall Tour de l'Eurométropole
 8th E3 Harelbeke
 10th Overall Ster ZLM Toer
1st  Points classification
2015
 9th Scheldeprijs

Grand Tour general classification results timeline

Endorsements
Farrar appears in the opening titles of ITV London morning weather forecasts. The forecasts are sponsored by Transitions Lenses who also sponsor Farrar's cycling team. In 2010, Transition Lenses featured Farrar in its online advertisements.

References

External links

 Cyclingnews.com: An interview with Tyler Farrar
 Team profile
 VeloNews.com: Interview with Farrar after his 2010 Giro d'Italia stage 2 win

1984 births
American male cyclists
Living people
People from Wenatchee, Washington
American Giro d'Italia stage winners
American Vuelta a España stage winners
American Tour de France stage winners
Cyclists from Washington (state)
Cyclists at the 2012 Summer Olympics
Olympic cyclists of the United States
2011 Tour de France stage winners
American firefighters